Abominog is the 14th studio album by British rock band Uriah Heep, released in March 1982 by Bronze Records in the United Kingdom, and in September 1982 by Mercury Records in the United States. It was their first album without keyboardist Ken Hensley. The album was critically acclaimed and fairly commercially successful, due in part to the band retooling and updating their sound to a contemporary style and delivering a "punchier, more pop metal era-appropriate effort.

It featured their last US hits, "On the Rebound" and "That's the Way That It Is". The latter was their highest-charting single of the 1980s, reaching No. 25 on the rock charts.

The album was preceded by a 7-inch EP titled Abominog Junior, featuring "On the Rebound" and two non-album tracks, Small Faces cover "Tin Soldier" and "Son of a Bitch".

Lineup
When the previous lineup disintegrated, guitarist Mick Box briefly considered forming a new group entirely, but ultimately decided to continue with the Heep name. Abominog was the first of three albums to feature both vocalist Peter Goalby and keyboard player John Sinclair. It also marked the return of drummer Lee Kerslake to the band; his previous departure had been due to his unhappiness with the band's management, rather than the personnel. Coming along with Kerslake was bassist Bob Daisley; the two musicians had been in Ozzy Osbourne's Blizzard of Ozz-era band before being fired by Sharon Osbourne.

Cover versions
Half of the 10 tracks are cover versions of recordings by other artists:

"On the Rebound" was originally recorded by Russ Ballard, on his Russ Ballard & the Barnet Dogs album (1980).
"Hot Night in a Cold Town" was originally recorded by John Cougar, on his Nothin' Matters and What If It Did album (1980). The song was written by songwriters Geoffrey Cushing-Murray and Richard Littlefield.
"Running All Night (With the Lion)" was originally recorded by Gary Farr's Lion, on their Running All Night album (1980). Lion keyboard player Sinclair brought this song with him when he joined Uriah Heep.
"That's the Way That It Is" was originally recorded by the Bliss Band, on their Neon Smiles album (1979).
"Prisoner" was originally recorded by Sue Saad and the Next, on their self-titled album (1980). The lyrics were written by D.B. (Dirty Boy) Cooper.

The album also included a remake of "Think It Over", a song recorded by the prior (and largely different) lineup of Uriah Heep. The original version (featuring John Sloman on lead vocals, Trevor Bolder on bass, Gregg Dechert on keyboards, and Chris Slade on drums), was the A-side of a 1980 Heep single.

Reception

A retrospective review by AllMusic noted that "echoes of the group's old style could be heard in the drama and instrumental firepower of the new songs, but the overall sound owed a greater debt to the New Wave of British Heavy Metal and harder-rocking AOR groups of the time", and concluded by saying that the album "rocks hard enough to please heavy metal addicts but is slick enough to win over AOR fanatics and this combination makes it one Uriah Heep's most enduring achievements. Canadian journalist Martin Popoff defined Abominog an "intelligent, well-paced record" where the "reinvented" Uriah Heep retools the genres of each song over "a decisively strong foundation of melodic metal", evoking "the magic of the NWOBHM, tinged with the complex chemistry of the peak Byron years."

Track listings

North American version

Personnel
Uriah Heep
Mick Box – guitars, backing vocals
Lee Kerslake – drums, backing vocals
Bob Daisley – bass, backing vocals
John Sinclair – keyboards, backing vocals
Peter Goalby – vocals

Production
Ashley Howe – producer, engineer, mixing
Nick Rogers – engineer
Howie Weinberg – mastering at Masterdisk, New York

Charts

Album

Singles

References

1982 albums
Uriah Heep (band) albums
Bronze Records albums
Mercury Records albums